KBDX (92.7 FM) is a radio station broadcasting a classic hits format. Licensed to Blanding, Utah, United States, the station is currently owned by William Boyle, through licensee San Juan Record Inc, and features programming from  ABC Radio - Classic Oldies.

During August 2008, KBDX was simulcasting a radio station from Truro, Massachusetts known as WGTX. KBDX could be heard broadcasting "Dunes 102", which is WGTX's slogan. WGTX received calls from listeners in Utah who were confused and thought they had heard a radio phenomenon known as E-skip.

KBDX now operates with its own dominant Red Rock 92 format, with ABC news on the hour and a meteorologist. The Red Rock format is a blend of 1970s and 80s pop hits, and is the only format of its kind in the Four Corners.

It has a very wide coverage area from south of Shiprock, New Mexico, and can be easily heard north of Moab, Utah. The station has two full power local translators, one in Moab, Utah (101.5 FM) and the other in Cortez, Colorado (96.1 FM). FCC information reports the transmitter is located at over 11,000 feet on "Abajo Peak" just west of Monticello, Utah, giving it a formidable coverage footprint.

References

External links

BDX
Classic hits radio stations in the United States